This is a selected list of notable artists from, or with links to, Luxembourg.

Pierre Brandebourg (1824–1878), painter, photographer
Claus Cito (1882–1965), sculptor
Michel Engels (1851–1901), illustrator, painter
Jean-Baptiste Fresez (1800–1867), artist 
Gust Graas (1924–2020), artist, businessman
Frantz Heldenstein (1892–1975), sculptor
Théo Kerg (1909–1993), artist  
Will Kesseler (1899–1983), painter
Emile Kirscht (1913–1994), painter
Nico Klopp (1894–1930), painter
Max Kohn (born 1954) painter, sculptor
Joseph Kutter (1894–1941), painter
Dominique Lang (1874–1919), painter 
Nicolas Liez (1809–1892), lithographer, painter
Michel Majerus (1967–2002), artist
Bady Minck (born 1960), artist, filmmaker
Raymond Petit (born 1954), sculptor
Joseph Probst (1911–1997), artist
Harry Rabinger (1895–1966), painter  
Pierre-Joseph Redouté (1759–1840), painter
Frantz Seimetz (1858–1934), painter 
Edward Steichen (1879–1973), painter, photographer 
Michel Stoffel (1903–1963), painter 
Foni Tissen (1909–1975), artist
Auguste Trémont (1892–1980), sculptor
Su-Mei Tse (born 1973), artist, sculptor
Sosthène Weis (1872–1941), painter, architect
Lucien Wercollier (1908–2002), sculptor

Luxembourg artists
Luxembourgian artists
Artists